Marny Elizabeth Kennedy is an Australian actress and singer. She is best known for her roles as Taylor Fry in the television series Mortified, Veronica di Angelo #2 on The Saddle Club and for recent appearances on Between Two Worlds and Home and Away. She also starred as Ally Henson in the TV series A gURLs wURLd. She is also known for her role as Winter Frey in the TV adaptation of Conspiracy 365. In 2011 she appeared in the short-film Golden Girl as teenage Cilla, whose life is drastically changed after she becomes scarred by a fire.

Filmography

TV

Discography

Soundtrack albums

Other appearances

Awards
Marny Kennedy won the Australian Film Institute's 2006 Young Actor Award for her starring role in Mortified.

References

External links

21st-century Australian actresses
Actresses from Melbourne
Australian child actresses
Australian film actresses
Australian television actresses
Living people
1994 births

|}